Stanošina is a settlement in the Haloze Hills in the Municipality of Podlehnik in eastern Slovenia. It stretches along the main road south of Podlehnik towards the border with Croatia. The area traditionally belonged to the Styria region. It is now included in the Drava Statistical Region.

The local church is dedicated to Our Lady of Sorrows and belongs to the Parish of Sveta Trojica–Podlehnik. The church was built between 1743 and 1773.

References

External links
Stanošina on Geopedia

Populated places in the Municipality of Podlehnik